The Headless Woman is an Argentine comedy film directed by Luis César Amadori and stars Niní Marshall.  It is a parody of the horror genre and the title alludes to the trick called "The Aztec Flower" that was used in shows, which makes the head of a woman appear separated from the body and located on a vase.

Plot
A circus gypsy girl (Nini Marshall) and a young friend (Perla Mux) flee from the police and take refuge in a strange house.

Cast
 Niní Marshall as Niní
 Francisco Charmiello as Manuel
 Angelina Pagano as Matilde
 Perla Mux as Nelly
 Tato de Serra as Carlos
 Pascual Pellicciotta as doctor
 Carlos Lagrotta as Cipriano Guevara
 Camilo Da Passano as Escribano Rómulo
 Zulma Montes
 Carlos Perelli as Ricardo Vila Gómez
 Luis Otero as Tommy
 Iris Portillo as Gitana
 Perla Achával
 Leticia Scury as Faraona
 Margarita Burke as Lola
 Antonio Martiánez as Eustaquio Rojas Vilas
 Gonzalo Palomero
 Arturo Bamio
 Nicolás Taricano
 María Ferez
 Miguel Caiazzo
 Carlos Alajarín
 Marcio Artinelli

References

External links 

1947 films
1947 horror films
1940s Spanish-language films
Argentine black-and-white films
Films directed by Luis César Amadori
1940s comedy horror films
Argentine comedy horror films
1947 comedy films
1940s Argentine films